= Sintal Agriculture =

Sintal Agriculture PLC
- Industry: Agriculture
- Founded: 1992
- Headquarters: Ukraine, Kharkiv
- Key people: Vadim Mogila, CEO; Anna Dudchenko, deputy CEO
- Products: Grain, technical crops and sugar
- Website: sintalagriculture.com

Sintal Agriculture Plc (Bloomberg ticker: SNPS GR) was one of Ukraine's agricultural holdings with a land bank of over 100,000 hectares in Kharkiv oblast and Kherson oblast. The land bank includes about 20,000 hectares of irrigated land, and Sintal cultivates more than 90,000 hectares of the land bank. The company specializes in growing wheat, maize, sunflower, barley, sugar beet, buckwheat, soybeans, peas, and other crops.

Sintal had been listed on the Frankfurt Stock Exchange in August 2008.

In 2014 the main company started bankruptcy.

== History ==
- 1992-2002 Sintal was established as a research company. During this period company undertook activities related to metal production and distribution.
- 2000-2002 In 2000, company invested into “Octyabrsky Sugar Plant” and brought the new management team to the plant. This enhanced efficiency of the sugar production.
- 2002-2005 Company realized the perspective of the agricultural business in Ukraine and took a decision to acquire two sugar plants with total production capacity of 30,000 tons per year. Taking into account the fact, that sugar beet growing is the most capital-intensive agricultural activity, Sintal Agriculture brought together the most professional Ukrainian agronomists, who were appointed as chief agronomists at the agricultural enterprises, where Sintal used land for own sugar beet planting. These agronomists controlled not only sugar beet planting process, but also its predecessors such as winter wheat and corn.
- 2005-2006 Sintal entered the land market to cover its requirements in raw materials for own sugar production by acquiring partner agricultural enterprises.
- 2007-2008 Sintal became a large player on the land market and one of the leading producer of agricultural products. Total area of the leased land amounted 75,000 ha by the end of 2008.
- 2014 - the main company started bankruptcy.

== Grain storage ==
- Company used to own 50% stake of Kherson elevator (50,000t) while Kharkiv elevator of 115,000t was under construction
- Company used to own grain warehouses with total capacity of 40,000t

== Trading ==
Contracted export sales was 15% of total harvest in 2009 including 23,000t of feed wheat, 15,000t of corn, 15,000t of sunseeds and 7,000t of soy
